Wild Flower is an album by the flautist Hubert Laws released on the Atlantic label in 1972.

Reception
The Allmusic review by Ron Wynn awarded the album 4½ stars calling it "A nice date from an earlier Laws period with a harder tone and more traditional jazz direction".

Track listing
 "Wild Flower" (John Murtaugh) - 3:14 
 "Pensativa" (Clare Fischer) - 4:05 
 "Equinox" (John Coltrane) - 6:26 
 "Ashanti" (Murtaugh) - 5:31 
 "Motherless Child" (Traditional) - 5:36 
 "Yoruba" (Murtaugh) - 6:07
Recorded in New York City on October 22, 1971 (tracks 2 & 3), November 23, 1971 (tracks 1, 4 & 5) and January 27, 1972 (track 6)

Personnel
Hubert Laws - flute, alto flute, piccolo, electric flute
Gary Burton - vibraphone
Chick Corea - piano  
Ron Carter, Richard Davis - double bass
Bernard Purdie - drums
Ramon "Mongo" Santamaría - congas
Joe Chambers, Airto Moreira, Warren Smith - percussion
Bernard Eichen, Paul Gershman, Harry Lookofsky, Guy Lumia, David Nadien, Gene Orloff, John Pintavalle, Matthew Raimondi, Aaron Rosand - violin
Julian Barber, Selwart Clarke, Harold Coletta, Richard Dickler, Harry Zaratzian - viola
Seymour Barab, Richard Bock, Charles McCracken, George Ricci, Alan Shulman - cello
John Murtaugh - arranger, conductor

References

1972 albums
Atlantic Records albums
Hubert Laws albums
Albums produced by Joel Dorn
Orchestral jazz albums